The Old Mill Building (historically known as the Main College Building) is the oldest campus building of the University of Vermont (UVM) and is located along the central eastern side of the "University Green" in Burlington, Vermont.

History 
The building was constructed in 1825 on the same site as its predecessor, which had burned down in 1824. The original Main College building was constructed in 1801–02 by the architect and master builder, John Johnson, who had also designed its replacement.

On April 26, 1825, the cornerstone for North College was laid by Vermont Governor Cornelius P. Van Ness.  Two months later on June 29, General Lafayette laid the cornerstone for South College during his visit to Burlington while on his national tour.

In 1825, the Main College consisted of two three-story  x  buildings known as the "North and South Colleges".  A third three-story building (with a length of ), known as the "Middle College" was erected between the two in 1829.  Each of the buildings was constructed about 7–8 feet apart to prevent fire from destroying the entire facility, as had occurred previously in 1824.  In 1846, the buildings were connected, however they were not accessible to one another within.  The building has undergone substantial renovations during several times.

Major renovations include a modernization effort in 1882–83, designed by J. J. R. Randall, 1918 (after a fire had struck South College), 1957–58 (with the addition of Lafayette Hall to South College), and in 1995–97 (with the addition of the Annex).

Old Mill was added to National Register of Historic Places as part of "University Green Historic District" on April 14, 1975. John Broza, an alum of UVM, proposed a stamp with Old Mill depicted on it. The stamp entered circulation in 1991, where John attended and signed the ceremony.

Current use and occupancy 

Today Old Mill is home to the Departments of English, Economics, Geography, and Political Science.  It is also host to the Programs for Women's Studies, Critical Race and Ethnic Studies (ALANA), and Global and Regional Studies; the Center for Holocaust Studies; the Humanities Center; and the John Dewey Lounge.

Gallery

References

External links 

  – University of Vermont

School buildings completed in 1825
University and college buildings on the National Register of Historic Places in Vermont
Buildings at the University of Vermont
National Register of Historic Places in Burlington, Vermont
Historic district contributing properties in Vermont
1825 establishments in Vermont